The Crossroads or The Junction is a 1951 Italian crime film directed by Fernando Cerchio and starring Raf Vallone, Charles Vanel and Claudine Dupuis. A criminal infiltrates the police to assist his gang, but begins to have a change of heart when he enjoys his new job.

The film's sets were designed by Luigi Ricci.

Plot
Italy, 1950s. Aldo Marchi (Raf Vallone), already decorated during the war and later became the leader of a dangerous criminal gang of thieves, managed to get into the police flying squad of Turin with the aim to safely direct the robbery of the companions

Cast
 Raf Vallone as Aldo Marchi
 Charles Vanel as Lubiani
 Claudine Dupuis as Giovanna
 Saro Urzì as Il brigadiere Carmelo Carlin
 Carlo Sposito as Il vice-commissario Sani
 Gianni Rizzo as Beppe detto il Curato
 Natale Cirino as Aldrighi
 Franco Navarra as L'Americano
 Saro Arcidiacono as Bergomi
 Pierangelo Attino as Gino
 Franco Balducci
 Evar Maran as Mario Boresi detto il Bello
 Mimo Billi as Un vice-commissario
 Piero Pastore as De Vecchi
 Gianni Luda
 Enzo Tarascio
 Delfi Tanzi
 Winni Riva
 Ermanno Pavarino
 Alberto Collo
 Michel Lemoine

References

Bibliography 
 Roberto Curti. Italian Crime Filmography, 1968–1980. McFarland, 2013.

External links 
 

1951 crime films
Italian crime films
1951 films
1950s Italian-language films
Films directed by Fernando Cerchio
Films scored by Carlo Rustichelli
Films set in Turin
Italian black-and-white films
1950s Italian films